This is a list of French football transfers for the 2001–02 summer transfer window. Only transfers featuring Division 1 and Division 2 are listed.

Division 2 

Note: Flags indicate national team as has been defined under FIFA eligibility rules. Players may hold more than one non-FIFA nationality.

Ajaccio

In

Out

Amiens

In

Out

Loan in 
5 July 2001
 Fabrice Abriel from Paris S-G

Beauvais

In

Out 

1 July 2001
 Nicolas Florentin to Nancy U-19
 Arnaud Gonzalez to Niort
 Komlan Assignon Retired
 Christophe Borbiconi Retired
 David Castilla Retired
 Cyril Charton Retired
 Stéphane Guiraud Retired
 Riad Hammadou Retired
 Johan Jacquesson Retired
 David Camara Free
 Réginald Ray Free
1 September 2001
 Frédéric Machado Retired
1 October 2001
 Sébastien Heitzmann to Reims
1 December 2001
 Hervé Fischer Free

Loans in 
1 July 2001
 Guillaume Beuzelin from Le Havre Loan
 Egutu Oliseh from Nancy Loan
 Mickaël Rodrigues from Nancy Loan
1 August 2001
 Marc-Eric Gueï from Montpellier Loan

Caen

In 

1 July 2001
 Sébastien Mazure from Le Havre
 Kamel Ouejdide from Red Star 	Return from loan
 Nicolas Seube from TFC B
31 July 2001
 Bogdan Hriscu from Dinamo Bucarest
12 September 2001
 Franck Dumas from Lens Free

Out 

1 July 2001
 Jérôme Hiaumet to Rennes U-19
 Grégory Tafforeau to Hellemmes
 Olivier Bogaczyk Retired
 Nicolas Esceth-N'Zi	Retired
 Miloš Glonek Retired
 Christophe Horlaville Retired
 Richard Lecour Retired
 Stéphane Tanguy Retired
 Frédéric Viseux Retired
 Johan Gallon Free
1 December 2001
 David Faderne to Corte
1 August 2001
 Arthur Gnohéré Retired

Châteauroux

In

Out

Créteil

In 

1 July 2001
 Mickaël Marquet	 M. Marquet	Nancy B	
 Fawzi Moussouni	 Fawzi Moussouni	JS Kabylie 	
 Mohamed Zouaoui	 Mohamed Zouaoui	Valence 	
 John Gope-Fenepej	 Gope-Fenepej	Nantes B	Loan
13 August 2001
 Mickaël Madar	 Mickaël Madar	Paris S-G 	
1 December 2001
 Koffi Fiawoo	 Koffi Fiawoo	Lorient
1 February 2002
 Paul-Hervé Essola	 P.-H. Essola	Bastia 	Loan

Out 

1 July 2001
 Stéphane Cassard	 S. Cassard	Strasbourg 	
 Hubert Castets	 Hubert Castets	Plouzané 	
 Lilian Compan	 Lilian Compan	Hyères 	
 Jean-Luc Dogon	 Jean-Luc Dogon	ASSE U-19	
 Rudy Giublesi	 Rudy Giublesi	Illies 	
 Mirko Jovanovic	 Mirko Jovanovic	Backa Topola 	
 Xavier Méride	 Xavier Méride	Douai 	
 Romain Pitau	 Romain Pitau	Montpellier 	
 Mathieu Assou-Ekotto	 Assou-Ekotto	Retired 	Free
 Adel Boutobba	 Adel Boutobba	Retired 	
 Samuel Fenillat	 Samuel Fenillat	Retired 	
 David Le Frapper	 D. Le Frapper	Retired 	
 Pascal Philippe	 Pascal Philippe	Retired 	
 Pierre Planus	 Pierre Planus	Retired 	
 Arnaud Séguy	 Arnaud Séguy	Retired 	
 M'Sadek Senoussi	 M. Senoussi	Retired 	
 Patrice Assouvie	 P. Assouvie	Free 	
 Philippe Cuervo	 Philippe Cuervo	Free 	
 René Peters	 René Peters	Free

10 August 2001
 Anthony Bancarel	 A. Bancarel	ACA U-19	
1 October 2001
 Mickaël Murcy	 Mickaël Murcy	Chartres 	
14 December 2001
 Nicolas Huysman	 Nicolas Huysman	UT Pétange 	Free
1 February 2002
 Franck Histilloles	 F. Histilloles	ASB B

Grenoble

In

Out 

1 July 2001
 Hugo Miguel Laranjo	 H. M. Laranjo	Retired	
 Marcio Menezes	 Marcio Menezes	Retired	
 Gabrijel Radojičić	 G. Radojicic	Retired	
 Sébastien Riou	 Sébastien Riou	Retired	
 Luciano Sergi	 Luciano Sergi	Retired	
 Julien Tissot	 Julien Tissot	Retired	
 Mounir Traoré	 Mounir Traoré	Retired	
 Jean-Pascal Yao	 Jean-Pascal Yao	Retired

Gueugnon

In 

1 July 2001
 Andrés Grande	 Andrés Grande	Ferro
 Guillaume Mulak	 Guillaume Mulak	GSI Pontivy
 Habibou Traoré	 Habibou Traoré	ASECN
2 July 2001
 Nicolas Diez	 Nicolas Diez	Racing Club
10 December 2001
 Pascal Gourville	 P.-D. Gourville	Sedan	Loan

Out 

1 July 2001
 Sylvio De Abreu	 Sylvio De Abreu	Retired	
 Pepe N'Diaye	 Sada N'Diaye	Retired	
 Marcelo Trapasso	 M. Trapasso	Retired	
 Fabien Weber	 Fabien Weber	Retired	
 Mickaël Wolski	 Mickaël Wolski	Retired	
 Jaouad Zaïri	 Jaouad Zaïri	Retired	
 Richard Massolin	 R. Massolin	Free	Free
1 December 2001
 Yohan Bouzin	 Yohan Bouzin	Retired

Istres

In 

1 July 2001
 Laurent Castro	 Laurent Castro	Red Star	
 Franck Chaussidière	 Chaussidière	Lens B	
 Jean-Yves de Blasiis	 De Blasiis	Norwich	
 Dragan Đukanović	 D. Djukanovic	Racing CFF	
 Malik Hebbar	 Malik Hebbar	Noisy-le-Sec	
 Patrice Maurel	 Patrice Maurel	TFC B	
 Cédric Mouret	 Cédric Mouret	Marseille	
 Filipe Teixeira	 Filipe Teixeira	Felgueiras	Free
 Brahim Thiam	 Brahim Thiam	Red Star	
 Samba Diawara	 Samba Diawara	Troyes B	Loan

29 August 2001
 Cédric Kanté	 Cédric Kanté	Strasbourg B	Loan
 Pascal Berenguer	 P. Berenguer	Bastia B	Loan

1 January 2002
 Ousmane Sanda Sanda	 O. Sanda Sanda	Anvers

Out 

1 July 2001
 Jérôme Adam	 Jérôme Adam	Saint-Nazaire AF	
 Christophe Duboscq	 C. Duboscq	Avranches B	
 Aziz Belissaoui	 Aziz Belissaoui	Retired	
 Vincent Ehouman	 Vincent Ehouman	Retired	
 Marc Maufroy	 Marc Maufroy	Retired	
 David Guion	 David Guion	Free

17 December 2001
 Laurent Castro	 Laurent Castro	Retired

24 January 2002
 Ibrahima Bangoura	 I. Bangoura	Retired

Laval

In 

1 July 2001
 Dramane Coulibaly	 D. Coulibaly	Marseille
 Rémi Gomis	 Rémi Gomis
 Jérôme Hiaumet	 J. Hiaumet	Caen
 Jérôme Monier	 Jérôme Monier	Troyes
 Miguel Mussard	 Miguel Mussard	Clermont
 Richard Socrier	 Richard Socrier	FBBP 01
 Mounir Soufiani	 Mounir Soufiani	Bourges 18
10 July 2001
 David Le Frapper	 D. Le Frapper	Créteil	Free
1 August 2001
 Mickaël Citony	 Mickaël Citony	Rennes	Loan
16 August 2001
 Philippe Cuervo	 Philippe Cuervo	Créteil	Free
15 November 2001
 Lionel Prat	 Lionel Prat	Free	Free

Out 

30 June 2001
 Ludovic Delporte	 L. Delporte	Douai
1 July 2001
 Éric Sitruk	 Eric Sitruk	Saint-Aubin
 Jean-Marie Stéphanopoli to Lorient
 Charles Devineau	to Nantes
 Hamed Modibo Diallo	 Hamed Diallo	Retired
 Sébastien Maté	 S. Maté	Retired
 Franck Moulin	 Franck Moulin	Retired
 Laurent Tomczyk	 Laurent Tomczyk	Retired
 Aziz Ben Askar	 Aziz Ben Askar	Free
 Cyril Yapi	 Cyril Yapi	Free

Le Havre

In 

1 January 2002
 Jamel Aït Ben Idir	 Aït Ben Idir
 David Martot	 David Martot	Fécamp

Out 

30 June 2001
 Adnan Čustović	 Adnan Custovic	Free agent
1 July 2001
 Yann Soloy	 Yann Soloy	Retired	
 Sébastien Mazure	 S. Mazure	FCBO	
 Guillaume Beuzelin	 G. Beuzelin	Free
19 September 2001
 Patrick Revelles	 P. Revelles	Unknown	
1 November 2001
 Éric Deloumeaux to Motherwell

Le Mans

In 

1 July 2001
 Didier Lang from Metz
 Yohann Rangdet from Red Star

Out 

31 May 2001
 Olivier Pickeu to	Caen
1 July 2001
 Cédric Chabert Retired
 Nicolas Dordevic Retired
27 January 2002
 Didier Drogba to Guingamp

Martigues

In 

1 July 2001
 Guillaume Boronad	 G. Boronad	Canet Roussillon	
 Baptiste Gentili	 B. Gentili	AC Ajaccio	
 Vincent Guignery	 V. Guignery	Libourne	
 Innocent Hamga	 Innocent Hamga	Espanyol B	
 Fabrice Kelban	 Fabrice Kelban	Charleroi	
 Mickaël Tacalfred	 M. Tacalfred	Red Star	Free
 Ronald Thomas	 Ronald Thomas	Guingamp	
 Patrick Videira	 Patrick Videira	Ermesinde	
 Kenny Vigier	 Kenny Vigier	Paris S-G B	
 Stéphane Borbiconi	 S. Borbiconi	Metz B	Loan
5 August 2001
 Gaël Hiroux from Paris Saint-Germain B	
23 August 2001
 Sylvain Deplace from Guingamp	Free
31 August 2001
 Anto Drobnjak from Sochaux	
1 August 2001
 Selim Benachour from Paris Saint-Germain loan
23 August 2001
 Hervé Bugnet from Bordeaux B Loan
1 December 2001
 Tagro Baléguhé from Marseille B	
 Sébastien Sansoni from Marseille B	
1 January 2002
 David Klein from Partick Thistle

Out 

29 June 2001
 Olivier Frapolli	 O. Frapolli	Laval
30 June 2001
 Gaël Hiroux	 Gaël Hiroux	Retired	
1 July 2001
 Azzouz Kara	 Azzouz Kara	Unknown	
 Richard Martini	 Richard Martini	La Cadière-d'Azur	
 Abassi Boinaheri	 A. Boinahéri	Retired	
 Domenico Bruno	 Domenico Bruno	Retired	
 Olivier Calabuig	 O. Calabuig	Retired	
 Jean-Jacques Davezac	 J.-J. Davezac	Retired	
 Samuel Lobé	 Samuel Lobé	Retired	
 Karim Malagouen	 Karim Malagouen	Retired	
 Philippe Mazzuchetti	 P. Mazzuchetti	Retired	
 Ali Meçabih to Grenoble
23 December 2001
 Patrice Eyraud Free
1 January 2002
 Alexandre Coulot to Avignon	
 Daniel Koffi-Konan to AC Port-de-Bouc	
 Gaël Hiroux to Paris Saint-Germain loan return

Nancy

In 

1 July 2001
 Cédric Bockhorni	 C. Bockhorni
 David Camara	 David Camara	Beauvais
 Pape Diakhaté	 Pape Diakhaté
 Laurent Dufresne	 L. Dufresne	Châteauroux
 Nicolas Florentin	 N. Florentin	Beauvais	Return from loan
 Philippe Schuth	 Philippe Schuth	Gueugnon	Free
 Sadio Sow	 Sadio Sow	Niort
 François Zoko	 François Zoko
 Mathieu Béda	 Mathieu Beda	Bordeaux B	Loan
25 August 2001
 Cyril Ramond	 Cyril Ramond	Montpellier	Loan

Out 

1 July 2001
 Frédéric Biancalani	 F. Biancalani	Guingamp W
 Johann Chapuis	 Johann Chapuis	Bresse Jura
 Abdeslam Ouaddou	 A. Ouaddou	Loto
 Nicolas Rabuel	 Nicolas Rabuel	VA
 Mickaël Rodrigues	 M. Rodrigues	Chambray
 Jérôme Bottelin to Beauvais (loan)
 Egutu Oliseh to Beauvais (loan)
 Loris Reina	 Loris Reina	Retired
 Pablo Correa	 Pablo Correa	Free
31 December 2001
 Ze Alcino	 Ze Alcino	Retired
4 February 2002
 Sadio Sow	 Sadio Sow	Free

Nice

In 

1 July 2001
 Abdallah Bah from D.C. United
 Kelly Berville from Valence	Return from loan
 Juan Carlos Carcedo from Atlético Madrid Return from loan
 Abdelmalek Cherrad from Cannes	Return from loan
 Jean-Charles Cirilli from USF Le Puy
 Christophe Meslin from Gazélec
 Romain Pitau from Créteil
 Janick Tamazout	 Janick Tamazout	Free

Out 

30 June 2001
 Alcaly Camara Retired
1 July 2001
 Éric Cubilier Retired
 José de la Sagra to Dénia
 Andrea Ghidini Retired
 Lionel Prat Retired
 Giancarlo Filippini Free
 Attilio Nicodemo Free
 Jero Shakpoke Free
 Gustavo Vasallo Free
1 August 2001
 Alphonse Tchami Retired
1 January 2002
 Juan Carlos Carcedo Free to Leganés

Nîmes

In 

1 July 2001
 Yohann Alemany	 Yohann Alemany
 Kévin Barralon	 Kevin Barralon	Lyon B
 Christophe Borbiconi	 C. Borbiconi	Beauvais
 Sébastien Bresson	 S. Bresson	Beaucaire
 Romain Canalès	 Romain Canalès
 Renaud Cohade	 Renaud Cohade	Lyon B
 Oifeck El-Moujahid	 O. El-Moujahid
 Ali Nechad	 Ali Nechad	Mende
 Mourad Ourahou	 Mourad Ourahou
 Frédéric Pierre	 F. Pierre	Anderlecht
 Réginald Ray	 Réginald Ray	Beauvais
1 January 2002
 Slađan Đukić from Troyes	Free
31 January 2002
 Ufuk Talay from Galatasaray

Out 

1 July 2001
 Régis Brouard	 Régis Brouard	Bastia
 Julien Leccese	 Julien Leccese	Unknown
 Frédéric Piquionne	 F. Piquionne	Martinique
 Julien Rantier	 Julien Rantier	Codogno
 Christophe Grau	 Christophe Grau	Retired
 Julien Vellas	 Julien Vellas	Retired
1 January 2002
 Sébastien Fidani	 S. Fidani	Retired
 Arthur Moses	 Arthur Moses	Retired

Niort

In 

1 July 2001
 Nacim Abdelali	 Nacim Abdelali		
 Tanguy Barro	 Tanguy Barro	RC Bobo	
 Mathieu Blais	 Mathieu Blais		
 Jocelyn Ducloux	 Jocelyn Ducloux	Louhans-Csx	
 Jérôme Foulon	 Jérôme Foulon	Guingamp B	
 Benoît Maurice	 Benoît Maurice	Clermont	
 Samuel Michel	 Samuel Michel	Guingamp	
28 January 2002
 Sebastián Cobelli	 S. Cobelli	Genoa

Out 

1 July 2001
 Cédric Pardeilhan	 C. Pardeilhan	Anglet	
 Miguel D'Agostino	 M. D'Agostino	Retired	
 Samba N'Diaye	 Samba N'Diaye	Retired	
 Franck Navarro	 Franck Navarro	Retired	
 Mickaël Tronche	 M. Tronche	Retired	
 Pascal Braud	 Pascal Braud	Free	
 Jean-Luc Escayol	 J.-L. Escayol	Free	
 Sadio Sow	 Sadio Sow	Free

Saint-Étienne

In 

1 July 2001
 Pathé Bangoura	 Pathé Bangoura		
 Olivier Baudry	 Olivier Baudry	Lausanne	
 Giovanni Bia	 Giovanni Bia	Bologna	
 Patrice Carteron	 P. Carteron	Sunderland	Return from loan
 Dominique Casagrande	 D. Casagrande	Paris S-G	
 Damien Deom	 Damien Deom	Red Star	
 David Hellebuyck	 D. Hellebuyck	Lausanne	
 Frédéric Mendy	 F. Mendy		
 Aleksandr Panov	 Aleksandr Panov	Lausanne	Return from loan
 Rodrigão Alflen	 Rodrigão Alflen	Santos
9 August 2001
 Marcin Kuźba	 Marcin Kuzba	Lausanne	
16 August 2001
 Patrick Guillou	 Patrick Guillou	Sochaux	
1 September 2001
 Antonio Esposito	 A. Esposito	Cagliari	
 1 November 2001
 Ted Agasson	 Ted Agasson	Free	
 Cyrille Pouget	 Cyrille Pouget	Marseille B	Loan
1 January 2002
 Eduardo Oliveira	 E. Oliveira	Sedan

Out 

1 June 2001
 Aloísio to PSG	
 Lionel Potillon	 Lionel Potillon	Free
1 July 2001
 Fabien Boudarène	 F. Boudarène	Lure	
 Stéphane Pédron	 S. Pédron	Lorient	
 Jérôme Alonzo	 Jérôme Alonzo	Retired	
 Loïc Chavériat	 L. Chavériat	Retired	
 Tchiressoua Guel	 T. Guel	Retired	
 Bjørn Tore Kvarme	 B. T. Kvarme	Retired	
 Christophe Sanchez	 C. Sanchez	Retired	
 Pape Sarr	 Pape Sarr	Retired	
 Jean-Guy Wallemme	 J.-G. Wallemme	Retired
1 August 2001
 Alex Dias	 Alex Dias	Retired	
28 September 2001
 Lucien Mettomo	 Lucien Mettomo	Retired	
28 December 2001
 Aleksandr Panov	 Aleksandr Panov	Retired

Strasbourg

In 

1 July 2001
 Christian Bassila	 C. Bassila	West Ham
 Gonzalo Belloso	 G. L. Belloso	Cruz Azul	Return from loan
 Guillaume Lacour	 G. Lacour	Lyon B
 Cédric Stoll	 Cédric Stoll
25 July 2001
 Mixu Paatelainen	 M. Paatelainen	Hibernian
10 September 2001
 Pierre Laurent from Bastia
1 December 2001
 Stéphane Collet from Real Sociedad
 Pape Thiaw from Lausanne	Loan

Out 

30 June 2001
 Pierre Njanka	 Pierre Njanka	Retired
1 July 2001
 Gharib Amzine	 Gharib Amzine	Troyes B
 Valérien Ismaël	 V. Ismaël	WBA	2.3 M€
 Christophe Eggimann	 C. Eggimann	Retired
 Nuno Mendes to União Leiria (loan)
28 August 2001
 Jacques Rémy to Grenoble
31 August 2001
 Péguy Luyindula	 P. Luyindula	Free
1 January 2002
 Gonzalo Belloso	 G. L. Belloso	Retired

Wasquehal

In

Out 

 Stéphane Dufour	 S. Dufour	Retired	
 Aziz El Khanchaf	 A. El-Khanchaf	Retired	
 Nicolas Mayeux	 Nicolas Mayeux	Retired	
 Sheriff N'Gom	 Sheriff N'Gom	Retired	
 Cyril Revillet	 Cyril Revillet	Retired

References 

French
Transfers winter
2001-02